Isaac Miller (born 21 June 1994) is a Scottish professional rugby union player who is currently playing for London Irish in Premiership Rugby. His regular playing position is hooker.

Miller played rugby for Loughborough Students RUFC whilst studying Sports Science at Loughborough University, and has also captained the side, in their National League 1 campaign. Miller has also played for Scotland at Under-20 level and Edinburgh at U18 level.

Miller's senior career took flight after being scouted by London Scottish Director of Rugby, Dave Morris. After signing for Scottish, Miller had a successful spell playing in the RFU Championship over the 2017/2018 RFU Championship rugby season. An outstanding debut season for the young Hooker, sparked interest from Aviva Premiership side Worcester Warriors. Worcester signed Miller on 20 February 2018. Joining the club at the end of the 2017/18 RFU Championship season.

References

External links
 https://www.ultimaterugby.com/player/view/11773

1994 births
Living people
Rugby union hookers
Worcester Warriors players
Loughborough Students RUFC players
London Scottish F.C. players
Rugby union players from Edinburgh
Alumni of Loughborough University
Scottish rugby union players